Syarikat Air Melaka Berhad (literally meaning Malacca Water Company Limited, abbreviated as SAMB), formerly known as Malacca Water Board from 1971 to 1992 and Malacca Water Corporation from 1993 to 2005, is a government-linked company responsible for the water supply services of the state of Malacca.

Sport
 SAMB FC (Association football)

References

External links
SAMB website

Malacca
Water companies of Malaysia
Privately held companies of Malaysia
Government-owned companies of Malaysia
1993 establishments in Malaysia
Companies established in 1993